The Big Operator may refer to:

 The Big Operator (1976 film), a 1976 French comedy film 
 The Big Operator (1959 film), a 1959 crime/drama film